The International Programme on the State of the Ocean (IPSO) focuses on the many factors that threaten the health of Earth's oceans. The organization is managed as a not for profit company registered in the United Kingdom. It is hosted by the Zoological Society of London. Dr. Alex Rogers is the Scientific Director of IPSO and Professor of Conservation Biology at the Department of Zoology, University of Oxford.

Areas of research 
 Effects of climate change on oceans 
 Overfishing
 Ocean acidification
 Habitat destruction of marine lifeforms
 Fisheries and climate change
 Detrimental resource extractions 
 Marine pollution
 Introduced species in marine environments

References

External links
 IPSO's website

Marine conservation organizations
Oceans
Zoology organizations
Biology societies